The teams competing in Group 7 of the 2011 UEFA European Under-21 Championships qualifying competition were Belgium, France, Malta, Slovenia and Ukraine.

Standings

Matches

Goalscorers 
As of 3 September, there have been 37 goals scored over 18 games, for an average of 2.05 goals per game.

1 goal

Own Goals
  Matija Škarabot (for France)

References 
 UEFA.com

8
2009–10 in Ukrainian football
2009–10 in French football
2010–11 in Ukrainian football
2010–11 in French football